Graphiphora is a genus of moths of the family Noctuidae.

Species
 Graphiphora augur (Fabricius, 1775)

References
Natural History Museum Lepidoptera genus database
Graphiphora at funet

Noctuinae